Lexmann is a Slovak surname.

List of people with the surname 

 Mikuláš Jozef Lexmann (1899 – July 17, 1952), Slovak priest
 Miriam Lexmann (born 1972), Slovak politician

See also 

 Lehmann

Surnames
Surnames of Slovak origin
Slovak-language surnames